The Minister of State for Harare Province is the governor of Harare Province in Zimbabwe. The governor oversees provincial affairs and sits in the House of Assembly of the Parliament of Zimbabwe. The governor is appointed by the President of Zimbabwe and is not appointed to a set term. Historically, the governor held the title Governor of Harare, but the office has since been renamed to align with the 2013 Constitution of Zimbabwe, which does not allow for provincial governors.

List of governors

See also 

 List of current provincial governors of Zimbabwe

References 

Governors of Harare Province